Francisco de Paula Donoso Vergara (1807–1888) was a Chilean lawyer and politician.

References 

1807 births
1888 deaths
Vergara family
Members of the Chamber of Deputies of Chile
Members of the Senate of Chile
People from Santiago
19th-century Chilean lawyers